Litipara is a village in Littipara CD block in Pakur subdivision of Pakur district in the Indian state of Jharkhand.

Geography

Location

Overview
Rajmahal coalfield is shown in the map. The entire area is overwhelmingly rural with only small pockets of urbanisation.

Note: The full screen map is interesting. All places marked on the map are linked and you can easily move on to another page of your choice. Enlarge the map to see what else is there – one gets railway links, many more road links and so on.

Demographics
According to the 2011 Census of India, Litipara had a total population of 2,294, of which 1,185 (52%) were males and 1,109 (51%) were females. Population in the age range 0–6 years was 309. The total number of literate persons in Litipara was 1,244 (62.67% of the population over 6 years).

Civic administration

Police station
Litipara police station serves Littipara CD block.

CD block HQ
Headquarters of Littipara CD block is at Litipara village.

Education
Rajyakrit High School Littipara is a Hindi-medium coeducational institution established in 1971. It has facilities for teaching from class VIII to class XII.

Model School Littipara is an English-medium coeducational institution established in 2012. It has facilities for teaching from class VI to class XII.

Kasturba Gandhi Balika Vidyalaya Littipara is a Hindi-medium girls only institution established in 2008. It has facilities for teaching from class VI to class XII.

Project Girls High School is a Hindi-medium girls only institution established in 1983. It has facilities for teaching from class VIII to class X.

References

Villages in Pakur district